Xiang Gong may refer to:

Xiang Gong or Aromatic Qigong
Duke Xiang (disambiguation)